Remus Vlad (born 19 January 1946) is a Romanian former professional footballer and manager. Vlad played as a defender.

Club career

Corvinul Hunedoara
Born in Cinciș, Hunedoara County (now, a village under water), Remus Vlad started his career at Corvinul Hunedoara, named Metalul at that time, the most representative club of the county in that period. After two seasons at senior level Vlad transferred to Argeș Pitești.

FC Argeș Pitești
At Pitești Remus Vlad played in 175 matches and scored 4 goals for the golden team of FC Argeș, a team full of great players in the history of the Romanian football, not just of the white and violet club, such as: "Bebe" Barbu, Marcel Pigulea or Nicolae Dobrin, being the captain of the squad. That team of FC Argeș won the first Liga I title in the history of the club and won in the 1972–73 European Cup against Real Madrid.

Corvinul Hunedoara
After a great period at Pitești, both for Vlad and for FC Argeș, he returned to Corvinul when he played another 4 years for the team that formed him as a player. At The Ravens Vlad was coached by Mircea Lucescu and played along with very important players like: Michael Klein or Radu Nunweiller.

International career
Remus Vlad played for Romania in 3 matches between 1972–1973, against Morocco, Peru and Soviet Union.

Manager career
After retirement Vlad became the manager of Corvinul in 1982, immediately after Mircea Lucescu's departure to Dinamo București. Vlad coached one of the best Corvinul and Gloria Bistrița teams, with the last ones playing also in the European Cups. At Corvinul he discovered Mircea Rednic, he also spent an important period at Universitatea Cluj and two halves of seasons at Dinamo București.

Honours
Argeș Pitești
 Liga I: 1971–72

References

External links
 
 

1946 births
Living people
People from Hunedoara County
Romanian footballers
Association football defenders
Romania under-21 international footballers
Romania international footballers
Liga I players
Liga II players
CS Corvinul Hunedoara players
ACF Gloria Bistrița players
Romanian football managers
CS Corvinul Hunedoara managers
FC Universitatea Cluj managers
ACF Gloria Bistrița managers
FC Dinamo București managers